All We Want is an EP released by H2O. It was released on October 29, 2002. It includes three previously unreleased tracks, two live versions of songs from the album Go and the music video for the song "Role Model".

Track listing
All songs by Todd Morse unless otherwise noted.
 "All We Want"
 "Static"
 "Wrong"
 "Role Model (Live at CBGB's)" 
 "Memory Lane (Live at CBGB's)" (Rusty Pistachio)

Personnel
 Toby Morse – vocals
 Todd Morse – guitar, vocals
 Rusty Pistachio – guitar, vocals
 Adam Blake – bass
 Todd Friend – drums, vocals

The album was recorded in August 2002 and mixed in September 2002 at BearTracks Recording Studio in Suffern, New York.

External links
 All We Want: H2o: video on Youtube

H2O (American band) albums
2002 EPs
MCA Records EPs
Albums produced by Eddie Wohl